The Best Horror of the Year: Volume Six is a horror fiction anthology edited by Ellen Datlow that was published on June 3, 2014. It is the sixth in The Best Horror of the Year series.

Contents
The book includes the following 24 works of short fiction, all first published in 2013:

Stephen Bacon: "Apports" 
Dale Bailey: "Mr. Splitfoot"
Nathan Ballingrud: "The Good Husband"
Nina Allan: "The Tiger"
Lynda E. Rucker: "The House on Cobb Street" 
K.J. Kabza: "The Soul in the Bell Jar"
Steve Toase: "Call Out"
Robert Shearman: "That Tiny Flutter of the Heart I Used to Call Love"
Ray Cluley: "Bones of Crow"
Jeannine Hall Gailey: "Introduction to the Body in Fairy Tales"
Conrad Williams: "The Fox"
Simon Clark: "The Tin House"
Simon Strantzas: "Stemming the Tide"
Priya Sharma: "The Anatomist’s Mnemonic"
Steve Rasnic Tem: "The Monster Makers"
Kim Newman: "The Only Ending We Have"
Derek Künsken: "The Dog’s Paw"
Lee Thomas: "Fine in the Fire"
Jane Jakeman: "Majorlena"
Tim Casson: "The Withering"
Neil Gaiman: "Down to a Sunless Sea"
Laird Barron: "Jaws of Saturn"
Linda Nagata: "Halfway Home"
Brian Hodge: "The Same Deep Waters as You"

References

External links
 

2014 anthologies
Horror anthologies
Night Shade Books books